America's Best Contacts & Eyeglasses is a discount provider of eye examinations, eyeglasses and contact lenses, with over 700 retail locations in the United States as of 2019. From 2005 to 2014, America's Best was a division of National Vision, a privately held portfolio company owned by Berkshire Partners.  In 2014, National Vision, Inc, was sold to KKR.

America's Best Contacts & Eyeglasses is the largest buyer of designer overstock eyeglass frames in the United States.

History
America's Best Contacts & Eyeglasses and its predecessor entities were founded in July 1978 by Bill Grody (at the age of 25), soon after federal deregulation permitted price advertising of eyewear, eye exams, and related services and supplies. 

ABC&E's first location was on Chicago's Magnificent Mile in September 1978 on the 15th floor of a North Michigan Avenue office building, along with ABC&E's in-house advertising agency.  From 1978 to early 1990, ABC&E remained internally financed.  By 1990 the company had 34 locations including a full-service lens manufacturing facility.  In April 1990, Grody sold the majority of the company in an LBO to Boston-based financial investors, Berkshire Partners, for $24 million, retaining minority ownership along with his senior management team.  In December, 1993, Grody orchestrated a management-led leveraged buyout of ABC&E, repurchasing the majority of the company for $40 million, with Berkshire Partners choosing to maintain a minority position.  In April 1997, Grody sold ABC&E in its entirety for $50 million to a strategic buyer, Chrysallis Management.  Grody led the company throughout its growth until its final sale in 1997.  

By 1997, ABC&E's revenues were $103 million and it had about 1,400 employees plus 150 independent doctors of optometry, 100 retail stores in 25 states, the District of Columbia, and Puerto Rico. 
Chrysallis Management, which owned eyewear stores located primarily in the Southwestern U.S., created Consolidated Vision Group ("CVG") in April 1997, a holding company established for its eyewear businesses including its purchase at that time of America's Best Contacts & Eyeglasses with America's Best Contacts & Eyeglasses as its largest and best known national brand. In 2003, America's Best Contacts & Eyeglasses had about $126 million in revenue from 105 locations. By 2004, it had $133 million from 111 locations.

In September, 2005, Berkshire Partners again acquired America's Best Contacts & Eyeglasses along with the entire eyewear holdings of CVG, and simultaneously purchased another national eyewear company, National Vision, Inc.  Upon its purchase, National Vision, Inc. became the parent company of all the eyewear businesses owned in the majority by Berkshire Partners with America's Best Contacts & Eyeglasses its largest division.

By the end of 2013, National Vision, Inc, had about 750 retail locations among with its America's Best Contacts & Eyeglasses brand accounting for about 425 locations. In the beginning of 2014, NVI was acquired in its entirety for more than $1 billion by KKR again with management participation and Berkshire Partners maintaining minority equity positions.

References

External links
Official website

Kohlberg Kravis Roberts companies
Private equity portfolio companies
Eyewear companies of the United States
American companies established in 1978
Retail companies established in 1978
Eyewear retailers of the United States